Peter Neville Frederick Porter OAM (16 February 192923 April 2010) was a British-based Australian poet.

Life
Porter was born in Brisbane, Australia, in 1929. His mother, Marion, died of a burst gall-bladder in 1938. He was educated at the Anglican Church Grammar School (then known as the Church of England Grammar School) and left school at eighteen to work as a trainee journalist at The Courier-Mail. However, he only lasted a year with the paper before he was dismissed. He emigrated to England in 1951. On the boat he met the future novelist Jill Neville. Porter was portrayed in Neville's first book, The Fall Girl (1966). After two suicide attempts, he returned to Brisbane. Ten months later he was back in England. In 1955 he began attending meetings of "The Group". It was his association with "The Group" that allowed him to publish his first collection in 1961.

He married Jannice Henry, a nurse from Marlow, Buckinghamshire, in 1961 and they had two daughters (born in 1962 and 1965). During this period he worked in advertising, and was beginning to find work in the literary press.  Jannice committed suicide in 1974, greatly affecting Porter's work, in particular The Cost of Seriousness. In 1991 Porter married Christine Berg, a child psychologist.

In 2001, he was named Poet in Residence at the Royal Albert Hall. In 2004 he was a candidate for the position of Professor of Poetry at Oxford University. In 2007, he was made a Royal Society of Literature Companion of Literature, an honour bestowed on a maximum of ten living writers.

Porter died on 23 April 2010, aged 81, after suffering from liver cancer for a year. After news of Porter's death in 2010, the Australian Book Review (ABR) announced that, in his honour, it would rename its ABR Poetry Prize as the Peter Porter Poetry Prize. He was buried on the eastern side of Highgate Cemetery.

Work
His poems first appeared in the Summer 1958 and October 1959 issues of Delta. The publication of his poem Metamorphosis in The Times Literary Supplement in January 1960 brought his work to a wider audience. His first collection Once Bitten Twice Bitten was published by Scorpion Press in 1961. Influences on his work include W. H. Auden, John Ashbery and Wallace Stevens. . He went through distinct poetic stages, from the epigrams and satires of his early works Once Bitten Twice Bitten, to the elegiac mode of his later ones; The Cost of Seriousness and English Subtitles. In a recorded conversation with his friend Clive James he stated that theglory of present-day English writing in America, in Australia and in Britain, is what is left over of the old regular metrical pattern and how that can be adapted to the new sense that the main element, the main fixture of poetry is no longer the foot (you know, the iambus or the trochee) but the cadence. It seems that what is very important is to get the best of the old authority, the best of the old discipline along with the best of the new freedom of expression.

In 1983 Porter was a judge in the Booker–McConnell Prize.

Awards
 1983: Duff Cooper Memorial Prize for his first Collected Poems
 1988: Whitbread Poetry Award for Automatic Oracle
 1990: Australian Literature Society Gold Medal for Possible Worlds
 1997: Age Book of the Year Poetry Prize Co-winner for Dragons in their Pleasant Palaces
 1998: The First King's Lynn Award for Merit in Poetry
 2000: Philip Hodgins Memorial Medal at the Mildura Writer's Festival
 2002: Forward Poetry Prize for Max Is Missing
 2002: Queen's Gold Medal for Poetry
 2004: Medal of the Order of Australia
 2004: Honorary Fellow of the English Association, UK
 2007: Royal Society of Literature Companion of Literature
 2009: Honorary Doctorate, Nottingham Trent University
 2009: Age Book of the Year Poetry Prize for Better Than God

Books

Poetry collections
 Once Bitten Twice Bitten, Scorpion Press, 1961
 Poems Ancient and Modern, Scorpion Press, 1964
 A Porter Folio, Scorpion Press, 1969
 The Last of England, Oxford University Press, 1970
 After Martial, Oxford University Press, 1972
 Preaching to the Converted, Oxford University Press, 1972
 Jonah, with Arthur Boyd, Secker & Warburg, 1973
 Living in a Calm Country, Oxford University Press, 1975
 The Lady and the Unicorn, with Arthur Boyd, Secker & Warburg, 1975
 The Cost of Seriousness, Oxford University Press, 1978
 English Subtitles, Oxford University Press, 1981
 Fast Forward, Oxford University Press, 1984
 Narcissus with Arthur Boyd, London: Seckers & Warburg, 1984
 The Automatic Oracle, Oxford University Press, 1987
 Mars, with Arthur Boyd, Deutsch, 1987
 Possible Worlds, Oxford University Press, 1989
 The Chair of Babel, Oxford University Press, 1992
 Millennial Fables, Oxford University Press, 1994
 Dragons in Their Pleasant Palaces, Oxford University Press, 1997
 Both Ends Against the Middle, 1999, as a section in Collected Poems Volume 2
 Max Is Missing, Picador/Macmillan, 2001
 Afterburner, Picador/Macmillan, 2004
 Better Than God, Picador, 2009
 Chorale at the Crossing, Pan Macmillan, 2016 (Posthumous)

Selected and collected poetry
 Collected Poems, Oxford University Press, 1983.
 A Porter Selected: Poems 1959–1989.  Oxford University Press, 1989.
 Collected Poems.  2 vols.  Oxford & Melbourne:  Oxford University Press, 1999.

Chapbooks

Poetry
 Solemn Adultery at Breakfast Creek The Keepsake Press, London, 1968 (200 copies)
 A Share of the Market Ulsterman Publications, Belfast, 1973.
 The Animal Programme: Four Poems Anvil Press Poetry Ltd, London, 1982 (250 copies). .
 Machines with illustrations by George Szirtes, Mandeville, Hitchin, Hertfordshire, 1986 (250 copies). .
 A King's Lynn Suite, King's Lynn Poetry Festival, 1999.
 Return to Kerguelen, Vagabond Press, London, 2001.

Essays
 Browning's Important Parleying: Stylistics across two centuries Leo S. Olschki Editore, Firenze, 1991.

Broadsheets
 Words Without Music, Sycamore Press, 1968.
 Epigrams by Martial, Poem-of-the-Month Club, 1971.

Translations
 After Martial Oxford University Press, 1972.
 from the Greek Anthology in Penguin Classics edition
 Michelangelo, Life, Letters, and Poetry, with George Bull Oxford University Press, 1987.
 Liu Hongbin, A Day Within Days, with the author. Ambit Books, London 2006. (Link to a reading of Porter's translation)

Essay collections
 Saving from the Wreck: Essays on Poetry. Trent, 2001.

Books edited
 A Choice of Pope's Verse, Faber and Faber, 1971.
 New Poems, 1971–1972: A P. E. N. Anthology of Contemporary Poetry, Hutchinson, 1972.
 The English Poets: From Chaucer to Edward Thomas, with Anthony Thwaite, Secker & Warburg, 1974.
 New Poetry I, with Charles Osborne, Arts Council of Great Britain, 1975.
 Thomas Hardy, selected, with photographs by John Hedgecoe, Weidenfeld & Nicolson, 1981.
 The Faber Book of Modern Verse 4th edition, originally edited by Michael Roberts, Faber and Faber, 1982.
 William Blake, selected, Oxford University Press, 1986
 Christina Rossetti, selected, Oxford University Press, 1986
 William Shakespeare, with an introduction, C. N. Potter, 1987, Aurum, 1988.
 Complete Poems, by Martin Bell, Bloodaxe, 1988.
 John Donne, edited, Aurum, 1988.
 The Fate of Vultures: New Poetry of Africa, with Kofi Anyidoho, and Musaemura Zimunya. Heinemann International, 1989.
 Lord Byron, Aurum, 1989
 W. B. Yeats:  The Last Romantic, Aurum, 1990.
 Percy Bysshe Shelley, selected, Aurum, 1991.
 Elizabeth Barrett Browning, selected, Aurum, 1992.
 Robert Burns, selected, Aurum, 1992.
 The Romantic Poets: Byron, Keats, Shelley, Wordsworth, selected, Aurum, 1992.
 Robert Browning, selected, Aurum, 1993.
 Samuel Taylor Coleridge, selected, Aurum, 1994.
 The Oxford Book of Modern Australian Verse, Oxford University Press, 1996.
 Selected Poems of Lawrence Durrell, Faber and Faber, 2006.

Scores and libretti
 Annotations of Auschwitz, with music by David Lumsdaine, Universal Edition, 1975.
 Orpheus:  A Chamber Opera in One Act, music by Geoffrey Burgon, Chester Music, 1985.
 The Voice of Love, words for a song cycle, music by Nicholas Maw.
 St Francis and the Wolf, an opera for children, music by Ronald Senator

In other media
 In 1981, Scottish post-punk band Scars recorded a song of Porter's poem "Your Attention Please" on their studio album Author! Author!.

Notes

Sources
 When London Calls: The Expatriation of Australian Creative Artists to Britain, Cambridge University Press, 1999
 Kaiser, John R: Peter Porter: A Bibliography 1954 – 1986 Mansell, London and New York, 1990. .
 Steele, Peter, Peter Porter: Oxford Australian Writers Oxford University Press, Melbourne, 1992.

External links

 Interview of Peter Porter by Ramona Koval, audio and transcript of The Book Show on ABC Radio National, on his last collection, Better than God, 15 April 2009
 Anthony Thwaite, "Peter Porter: Poet celebrated as among the finest of the second half of the 20th century", The Independent, 24 April 2010.
 Robert Potts, "Peter Porter obituary", The Guardian, 23 April 2010.
 Obituary in the Oxonian Review
Poetry Foundation profile
Profile at Poetry Archive
Oxonian Review. 24 May, 2010, Issue 12.3 memorial essay

1929 births
2010 deaths
Burials at Highgate Cemetery
20th-century British male writers
20th-century British poets
ALS Gold Medal winners
Australian emigrants to England
Australian poets
British male poets
Deaths from cancer in England
Deaths from liver cancer
Fellows of the English Association
Fellows of the Royal Society of Literature
People educated at Anglican Church Grammar School
People from Brisbane
Recipients of the Medal of the Order of Australia